White River is a suburb on the fringe of Honiara, Solomon Islands and is located  west of the main center on the Tandai Highway. White River is in the Honiara City Council ward of Nggosi. A water spring supplies water to the community.

White River is East of Kakabona and West of Tandai.

Tandai/Tadai Highway

In 1966, the main coastal road out of Honiara west of Rove Creek as far as Poha River was named Tadai which connected the Mendana Avenue through Honiara and after Mataniko River to Prince Philip Highway.

Villages
 Wind Valley
 Independence Valley
 Laundry Valley
 Banana Valley
 Namoruka

Squatter settlements

According to a 2009 study 23% of the White River community are squatter settlements. Tensions surrounding the squatters continue and in 2014 houses in the Independence Valley were burnt down.

Government approved areas were provided in White River where people were allowed to settle providing they had a licence and had to pay rent to the Lands Division usually for a 12-month period at $10.00 per household per year.

Education
 White River High School
 White River Kindergarten
 Kelyn Pre School

Churches
 Roman Catholic parish
 Anglican Church
 Seventh Day Adventist Church
 Apostolic Life Church
 Agape Church
 Solomon Islands Revival Fellowship Church 
 The church of Christ of latter-Day saints

Culture

A dance program held in 1974 at White River recorded 20 dancers taking part in the mu'aabaka 
 White River SDA choir
 White River children performing Numba Hak
 Litol rasta and solkizs performing at White River

Law and Order
 White River Police Post

Before the 2006 riots 3,000 Malaitans, mainly youths and young men insulted by graffiti, went in pursuit of Rennell and Bellona settlers in White River. Shops were ransacked and people were injured and forty-five arrests were made, the national Government paid Malaita Province S$200,000 in compensation.

2014 Floods

White River was severely affected as a result of the 2014 floods

Commerce

There are several commercial areas in the area, near the Centre there are six or seven shops, and on the main road across from Karaina is one of the largest betel nut markets in Solomon Islands. There are several new Chinese shops near the O1 and O2 bus stops.

The White River market was established in 2001 by the Westside Women for Peace. Women from rural North West Guadalcanal, on the provincial side of White River, would bring fresh vegetables, root crops, fish, and
raw meat such as wild pig. Women from Malaita, based in the capital Honiara, would bring non-perishable food items from the stores. On October 11, 2005, notices were served and signed by the government official, instructing the Westside Women for Peace to remove all privately built stalls in the market within five days, to cease market activities on Sundays and to cooperate with government officials on any developments in the area. The White River Markets still operate unlicensed and informal, with marketers targeted by the Honiara City Council for operating without a license.

 Eucheuma Cottonii Seaweed business

Employment
A study reports that 67% of youths at White River state they receive no regular income sources.

Tourism
 Rain Tree Bed and Breakfast  
 The Ofis

Recording Studios

The song Bereft of a mother (composer Pu Timoio of Tavi lineage of Kafika) was recorded in 1928 and in 1973 at White River.   The composer mourns the death of his mother in a moving reference to the care she took.
 Mountol Sound Studio 
 Brekin Records

Sport
 White River Demons AFL football Club 
 White River High School rugby 
 White River High School Soccer Club 
 White River Boxing Club 

 White river Rookies Basketball Team
 West side Bullets Basketball Team
 White River Rainbow Volleyball Team
 West crown Tigers Soccer Club
 Avaiki Rugby Club
 Tia warriors Rugby Club

Health
 White River Health Clinic

Power Station
Land has been acquired for the construction of a 33kV White River Substation.

Languages
 Ghari language

Notable people
 Jimmy Nare (artist)

References

See also
 White River Facebook Page
 The Ofis Bed and Breakfast
 The Ofis bed and Breakfast

Suburbs of Honiara